The 2018–19 Kennesaw State Owls men's basketball team represented Kennesaw State University in the 2018–19 NCAA Division I men's basketball season. They played their home games at the KSU Convocation Center in Kennesaw, Georgia and were led by fourth-year head coach Al Skinner. They finished the season 6-26 overall, 3–13 in ASUN play to finish in a tie for 8th place, and due to their tiebreaker over Stetson, they qualified for the conference tournament. As the #8 seed in the ASUN tournament, they lost in the first round to top-seeded Lipscomb 71–86.

On February 21, 2019, Skinner announced his resignation from Kennesaw State effective at the end of the season.

Previous season
The Owls finished the 2017–18 season 10–20, 6–8 in ASUN play to finish in sixth place. They lost in the quarterfinals of the ASUN tournament to Jacksonville.

Roster

Schedule and results

|-
!colspan=12 style=| Exhibition

|-
!colspan=12 style=| Non-conference regular season

|-
!colspan=9 style=| Atlantic Sun Conference regular season

|-
!colspan=12 style=| Atlantic Sun tournament
|-

|-

Source

References

Kennesaw State Owls men's basketball seasons
Kennesaw State Owls
2018 in Georgia (U.S. state)